Jacques Barnaud (born 24 February 1893 in Antibes – died 15 April 1962 in Paris) was a French banker, businessman and member of the collaborationist Vichy regime during the Second World War.

A graduate of the École Polytechnique, Barnaud worked for the Banque Worms as an executive from 1928 to 1939.

He was enthusiastic about the Vichy regime and following the appointment of François Darlan as Prime Minister of France in February 1941, Barnaud was brought into the government as Delegate General for Franco-German Economic Relations. Along with the likes of Jean Bichelonne, François Lehideux and Pierre Pucheu, he was a member of a group of technocrats who were important in the early days of the Vichy regime.

Barnaud worked with Nazi Germany during the occupation in order to secure deals to supply them with aluminium and rubber from French Indo-China. He did, however successfully oppose a plan suggested by Hermann Göring that the Nazis collect France's church bells and melt them down for their metal content, feeling that such a scheme would breed too much resentment against the Nazi occupiers.

Barnaud was arrested in October 1944, on charges of providing the enemy with intelligence. After several delays the charges were dismissed in 1949. He returned to his business interests and amassed a fortune in post-war France.

References

1893 births
1962 deaths
People from Antibes
People of Vichy France
French bankers
French collaborators with Nazi Germany
Order of the Francisque recipients